Robinson Njeru Githae is a Kenyan politician. He belongs to the Party of National Unity and was elected to represent the Ndia Constituency in the National Assembly of Kenya since the Kenyan parliamentary election, 2002. He has served as assistant minister in the ministries of justice, transport and local government before being appointed a minister in the ministries of Nairobi Metropolitan then Kenya's finance minister. He was appointed by President Uhuru Kenyatta as Kenya- US ambassador on 14/08/2014. He was later transferred to Vienna in May 2019 as Kenya’s ambassador to Austria where he is currently serving.

He has three well-known sisters: former Chief Nursing Officer Eunice Muringo Kiereini ,the writer Micere Githae Mugo and Mrs. Purity Gathoni Macharia, co-founder and co-owner of Royal Media Services. Their father was Solomon Githendui Githae (1904-2007). In May 2019 he was appointed as Kenyan ambassador to Vienna, Austria.

References

Living people
1957 births
Party of National Unity (Kenya) politicians
Members of the National Assembly (Kenya)
Ministers of Finance of Kenya
Ambassadors of Kenya to the United States
University of Nairobi alumni
Kenya School of Law alumni